H3K27 is the 27th amino acid in Histone H3, which as a lysine is written "K" in single-letter amino acid notation.  It is subject to posttranslational modification with epigenetic effects:

 H3K27ac, an acetylation
 H3K27me3, a tri methylation